Christopher R. Seitz (born 1954) is an American Old Testament scholar and theologian known for his work in biblical interpretation and theological hermeneutics. He is the senior research professor of biblical interpretation at Toronto School of Theology, Wycliffe College. He is also an ordained priest in the Episcopal Church, and served as canon theologian in the Episcopal Diocese of Dallas (2008-2015).

Education and career 

Seitz received an AB from the University of North Carolina, in 1976, an MTS from Virginia Theological Seminary, in 1979. He studied at the University of Munich, 1979–80, and received several degrees from Yale University: STM 1981; MA 1982; MPhil 1983; PhD 1986.

Seitz was ordained by William H. Folwell for the Episcopal Diocese of Central Florida as a deacon on June 22, 1980 and as a priest on January 11, 1981.
 
He began his teaching career as Assistant Professor of Old Testament at The Lutheran Theological Seminary in Philadelphia (1984–87), before becoming Associate Professor of Old Testament at Yale in 1987. He was Professor of Old Testament at Yale from 1993-97 and then took a chair at the University of St Andrews (Scotland) in 1998 where he was Professor of Old Testament and Theological Studies at St Mary’s College until 2007. He is presently Senior Research Professor of Biblical interpretation at Wycliffe College in the University of Toronto. He is a co-founder of the Wycliffe Center for Scripture and Theology.

Academic and ecclesial work 

Seitz is the author and editor of more than twenty books; he is best known for his volume on Isaiah 1—39 in Interpretation Commentary Series, held in 727 libraries according to WorldCat, and translated into Korean, Japanese and Italian. Other major works include Word Without End, Figured Out, Isaiah 40—66 (New Interpreter’s Bible), Prophecy and Hermeneutics, The Goodly Fellowship of the Prophets, and The Character of Christian Scripture. Recently, he has written a commentary on Colossians for the Brazos Theological Commentary series (2014), in which the place of the book in a wider Letter Collection is evaluated. A commentary on Joel for the new International Theological Commentary series appeared in 2016.  Additionally, he has contributed more than sixty articles to journals and publications, including Journal of Biblical Literature, Vetus Testamentum, Journal for the Study of the Old Testament, Scottish Journal of Theology, Interpretation, Theology Today, Biblische Zeitschrift, Anglican Theological Review, Zeitschrift für die Alttestamentliche Wissenschaft, The Christian Century, The Anchor Bible Dictionary, First Things, and Pro Ecclesia. He is the Editor of Studies in Theological Interpretation, and has served on the editorial boards of Interpretation, Hermeneia, Journal of Theological Interpretation, Zeitschrift für die alttestamentliche Wissenschaft, and Pro Ecclesia.

He is a two-time Alexander von Humboldt research scholar (1991-2 at the University of Munich and 2013 at the University of Göttingen), a Henry Luce III Foundation grant recipient, and a Fellow of the Center of Theological Inquiry in Princeton, New Jersey.

Seitz is an ordained Episcopal priest and has served parishes in Texas, Connecticut, Pennsylvania, Germany, France and Scotland. He currently serves as the president of The Anglican Communion Institute and was canon theologian in the Episcopal Diocese of Dallas until 2015. At present he lives with his wife Elizabeth in Courances, France. He was Visiting Professor at Centre Sevres in Paris 2019-2021.

Contribution 

Seitz has been influenced by his former teacher and then Yale colleague Brevard Childs, a key figure advocating for the significance of canon in biblical interpretation, and for the appropriate use of the Old Testament in Christian theology. His recent book discusses the historical legacy of canonical reading, kindred developments at Vatican II, and important convergences in the work of the late French scholar, Paul Beauchamp. In 2021 he was presented with a Festschrift honoring his life and work.

Authored Works

Books edited

Festschrift

References 

1954 births
Living people
American theologians
Academics of the University of St Andrews
People from Blowing Rock, North Carolina